Tropicália 2 is an album by Brazilian musicians Caetano Veloso and Gilberto Gil, released in August 1993 through WEA. It celebrates the 25th anniversary of the release of Tropicália: ou Panis et Circencis.

Background and recording
Tropicália 2 was recorded from March 1993 to May 1993 at Nas Nuvens and Polygram in Rio de Janeiro and WR Salvador in Salvador, Bahia.

Music and lyrics
The album features politically charged lyrics on topics such as superpower imperialism, Third World poverty, and the AIDS epidemic. "Haiti" links the Carandiru massacre to the history of slavery on a transnational scale.

Critical reception

Alvaro Neder of AllMusic said, "The album, in philosophical terms, expresses fragile concepts. Poetically and musically, represents good entertainment, and, in its best moments, good Art."

Track listing

Notes
"Wait Until Tomorrow" is a cover of the song of the same name by the Jimi Hendrix Experience.

Personnel
Credits adapted from liner notes.

 Caetano Veloso – vocals, acoustic guitar , arrangement , keyboards [with samplers] , whistling 
 Gilberto Gil – vocals, acoustic guitar , arrangement 
 Liminha - acoustic guitar , arrangement , bass , drum programming , guitar [Ebow] , keyboards , percussion , sampler 
 Nara Gil – vocals 
 Celso Fonseca – acoustic guitar 
 Raphael Rabello – seven-string acoustic guitar , arrangement 
 Beterlau – agogô 
 Zé Carlos – alto saxophone 
 Serginho Trombone – trombone , arrangement 
 Léo Gandelman – baritone saxophone 
 Arthur Maia – bass 
 Dadi – bass 
 Dininho – bass 
 Nico Assumpção – six-string bass 
 Luciana Rabello – cavaquinho 
 Alceu De Almeida Reis – cello 
 Lui Coimbra – cello , arrangement 
 Luiz Fernando Zamith – cello 
 Marcio Mallard – cello 
 Moreno Veloso – cello , pandeiro 
 Zeca Da Cuica – cuica 
 Ramiro Musotto – drum programming 

 Carlinhos Bala – drums 
 Wilson das Neves – drums 
 Bidinho – flugelhorn 
 Marcio Montarroyos – flugelhorn 
 Lucas Santtana – flute 
 Wilson Canegal – ganzá 
 Pedro Sá – guitar 
 Daniel Jobim – keyboards 
 William Magalhães – keyboards 
 Zizinho – pandeiro 
 Carlinhos Brown – percussion , shaker 
 Firmino – percussion 
 Marcelo Costa – percussion 
 Cosminho – bacurinha 
 Trambique – repinique 
 Bogam – surdo 
 Roberto Bastos Pinheiro – surdo 
 Marçal – tamborim 
 Raul Mascarenhas – tenor saxophone 
 Léo Bit Bit – surdo virado , timbales 
 Bidinho – trumpet 
 Márcio Montarroyos – trumpet 
 Arlindo Penteado – viola 
 Hindemburgo Pereira – viola 
 Aizik Geller – violin 
 César Guerra-Peixe – arrangement 
 Rodrigo Campello – arrangement 
 Chris Bellman – mastering

References

1993 albums
Caetano Veloso albums
Gilberto Gil albums
Elektra Records albums
Nonesuch Records albums
Philips Records albums
PolyGram albums
Universal Music Group albums
Warner Music Group albums
Albums produced by Caetano Veloso
Albums produced by Gilberto Gil
Albums produced by Liminha
Portuguese-language albums